
William Culp Darrah (19091989) was an American professor of biology at Gettysburg College in Pennsylvania. He also had an interest in, and published several works on, 19th-century photography. 

Born in Reading, Pennsylvania, his was a specialist in paleobotany. Darrah was a fellow of the American Association for the Advancement of Science, as well a member of Sigma Xi and the Botanical Society of America.

As an authority on the history of photography, he authored several books about 19th-century photo processes and photographers. As part of his interest in early photography, he assembled a collection of over 60,000 cartes-de-visite, which is now held at Penn State University.

He died in Gettysburg, Pennsylvania.

Selected bibliography

Biology
Principles of paleobotany (1960)
Textbook of paleobotany (1939)
A critical review of the upper Pennsylvanian floras of eastern United States with notes on the Mazon Creek flora of Illinois (1969)

Photography
Stereo views, a history of stereographs in America and their collection (1964) 
A check list of Maine photographers who issued stereographs (1967)
An Album of stereographs : or, Our country victorious and now a happy home : from the collections of William Culp Darrah and Richard Russack (1977) 
The world of stereographs (1977)
Cartes de visite in nin[e]teenth century photography (1981)

References

External links
 Papers of William C. Darrah, MS-128 at Gettysburg College
William C. Darrah collection of cartes-de-visite, 1860-1900 HCLA 1515 at Pennsylvania State University Libraries

1909 births
1989 deaths
Historians of photography
Paleobotanists
20th-century American botanists
Gettysburg College faculty
Fellows of the American Association for the Advancement of Science
People from Reading, Pennsylvania
20th-century American historians
American male non-fiction writers
Historians from Pennsylvania
20th-century American male writers